Mimosa ophthalmocentra, or jurema-embira ("red jurema"), is a tree in the family Fabaceae.  It is native to Brazil.  It is shrub or small tree about 3 to 5 m tall.  Its blossoms come in long, narrow cylindrical spikes having yellowish white petals and a white stamen. The blossoms are sometimes found to have a pink tinge.  The fruit is green, sometimes with red or purple, flat, about 8 cm long and about 1 cm wide.

The trunk grows to about 20 cm in diameter.

Its wood has a density of about 1.12 g/cm3 and it makes good firewood.

Traditional use
Traditionally in northeast Brazil, for cases of cough and bronchitis, a water extract (decoction) of Mimosa ophthalmocentra is made into a drink.  A handful of bark in one liter of water is used by itself or in a syrup.  The solution is taken until the symptoms subside.

References

External links
Microscope slide of Mimosa ophthalmocentra wood sample (www.kew.org)
Mimosa ophthalmocentra herbarium specimen (NY Botanical Gardens)

ophthalmocentra
Flora of Brazil
Medicinal plants of South America